Liparocephalus is a genus of rove beetles in the family Staphylinidae. There are at least four described species in Liparocephalus.

Species
These four species belong to the genus Liparocephalus:
 Liparocephalus brevipennis Mäklin, 1853
 Liparocephalus cordicollis LeConte, 1880
 Liparocephalus litoralis Kirschenblatt, 1938
 Liparocephalus tokunagai Sakaguti, 1944

References

Further reading

 
 
 
 
 

Aleocharinae
Articles created by Qbugbot